The Melaka Folks Art Gallery is an art gallery in Melaka City, Melaka, Malaysia, dedicated to promote the work and themes of local artists in Melaka.

History
The gallery was inspired by Yang di-Pertua Negeri of Melaka Mohd Khalil Yaakob. It was opened on 25 March 2008 and was officiated by Melaka Chief Minister Mohd Ali Rustam on 28 June 2008.

Architecture
The gallery is housed in a two-story building. It consists of a painting studio room for painters to produce their artworks and a shop.

Exhibitions
The main exhibition hall of the gallery houses more than 80 paintings with various themes made by local artists. The gallery regularly held various painting exhibitions as well as painting workshops.

See also
 List of tourist attractions in Melaka

References

2008 establishments in Malaysia
Art museums and galleries in Melaka
Buildings and structures in Malacca City